Mohammad Azhar Khan (born September 7, 1955, Gujranwala, Punjab) is a former Pakistani cricketer who played in one Test in 1980.

Azhar Khan played first-class cricket in Pakistan from 1972 to 1993. His highest score was 209 not out for Pakistan Universities against Bahawalpur in 1974–75. A year later, also against Bahawalpur, he made 203, this time for Lahore A.

In February 2020, he was named in Pakistan's squad for the Over-50s Cricket World Cup in South Africa. However, the tournament was cancelled during the third round of matches due to the coronavirus pandemic.

References

External links
 
 Azhar Khan at CricketArchive

1955 births
Living people
Azhar Khan
Pakistani cricketers
Lahore A cricketers
Habib Bank Limited cricketers
Pakistan Universities cricketers
Gujranwala cricketers
Pakistan International Airlines cricketers
Lahore City cricketers
Cricketers from Gujranwala